Craven Creek is a stream in the U.S. state of South Dakota.

Craven Creek has the name of Gus Craven, a cattleman.

See also
List of rivers of South Dakota

References

Rivers of Jackson County, South Dakota
Rivers of South Dakota